F-ve Dolls (sometimes stylized as F-VE DOLLS, formerly known as 5dolls) was a South Korean girl group formed by Core Contents Media in 2011. The group was composed of six members: Hyoyoung, Seunghee, Yeonkyung, Hyewon, Eunkyo and Nayeon. They debuted with two single tracks, "Lip Stains" (입술자국) and "I Mean You" (너 말이야), in 2011. The group was known as "Female Unit" of Coed School until CCM's announced that the group became independent in 2013. The group disbanded on March 10, 2015.

History

2010: Formation 
In December 2010, Coed School broke into sub-groups. The female members Lee Soo-mi, Heo Chan-mi, Ryu Hyo-young and Jin Hye-won, with the addition of new member Seo Eun-kyo, became 5dolls.

2011: Debut with Lip Stains, Charming Five Girls,  Time to Play 
On January 20, 2011, 5dolls released two promotional videos featuring Jay Park, one called "Lip Stains" and the other one called "I Mean You" (or "It's You"). The group released its first mini album on February 16, 2011, and debuted on M! Countdown on February 17, 2011. During their live performances, the group received criticism for presumably lip synching. 5dolls released their second mini-album Time To Play on May 11, 2011, with their lead single "Like This Or That" (이러쿵 저러쿵) and the music video. "Like This or That" stands as the highest selling song for a rookie of 2011 with US$192,000 grossed.

2012–13: Line-up changes, Since 1971, First Love 
2012 saw the departure of both Soomi and Chanmi from the group, in February and summer respectively. Han Na-yeon and Shannon were announced as replacements and, in February 2013, trainee Choi Ji-hyun was also said to be joining the group, thus becoming six. On July 8, 2013, the group officially announced that they would be returning at the end of the month with a new single called "Soulmate #1" as well as a new stage name, F-ve Dolls. However, of the three new members announced, only Nayeon stayed, and the other two gaps were filled by Cho Seung-hee and The SeeYa member Oh Yeon-kyung, who simultaneously promoted the two groups. On July 31, 2013, their first digital single "Since 1971" was released with the music video of the title track "Soulmate #1". The song charted 62 on the Gaon Chart and 44 on the Billboard Korea Hot 100. F-ve Dolls promoted "Soulmate #1" from July 31 through September 1, 2013.

F-ve Dolls followed-up promotions with a new mini-album called "First Love", which was released on September 17. The group promoted with the song "Can You Love Me?", which features new T-ara N4 member Kim Dani, making it her debut. On 17 September 2013, a second version of "Can You Love Me?" music video and a music video for the song "Deceive" were released.

2014–2015: Disbandment 
In November 2014, it was reported that F-ve Dolls was disbanded after their labels were renamed, and subsequently F-ve dolls was deleted from the official label's website.
On March 10, 2015, the label confirmed the official disbandment of the group. It was stated that those members who still had a contract with the agency will be part of a new group. In September 2015, Cho Seunghee re-debuted with new group DIA, but she left the group the following year.

Members

Past members 
 Lee Soo-mi (이수미)
 Cho Seung-hee (조승희)
 Han Na-yeon (한나연)
 Heo Chan-mi (허찬미)
 Ryu Hyo-young (류효영)
 Oh Yeon-kyung (오연경)
 Seo Eun-kyo (서은교)
 Jin Hye-won (진혜원)

Temporary members 
 Shannon (샤넌)
 Choi Ji-hyun (최지현)

Timeline

Discography

Extended plays

Singles

Music videos

Notes

References 

K-pop music groups
MBK Entertainment artists
South Korean dance music groups
South Korean girl groups
Musical groups established in 2011
2011 establishments in South Korea
Musical groups disestablished in 2015
2015 disestablishments in South Korea